Merlina may refer to:

 Merlina (Sonic the Hedgehog)
 Merlina DeFranco, part of the DeFranco Family